National Street is one of three stations on Metra's Milwaukee District West Line in Elgin, Illinois. In Metra's zone-based fare system, National Street is in zone H. As of 2018, National Street is the 89th busiest of Metra's 236 non-downtown stations, with an average of 584 weekday boardings. National Street was also used by commuter trains of the Milwaukee Road, the predecessor to Metra.

As of December 12, 2022, National Street is served by 45 trains (23 inbound, 22 outbound) on weekdays, by all 24 trains (12 in each direction) on Saturdays, and by all 18 trains (nine in each direction) on Sundays and holidays. On weekdays, one inbound train originates from here, and one outbound train terminates here.

The station is adjacent to the site of the former Elgin National Watch Company.

Bus connections
Pace

References

External links 

Flickr - National Street Station

Elgin, Illinois
Metra stations in Illinois
Transportation buildings and structures in Kane County, Illinois
Former Chicago, Milwaukee, St. Paul and Pacific Railroad stations